Rybatsky (masculine), Rybatskaya (feminine), or Rybatskoye (neuter) is the name of several rural localities in Russia:
Rybatsky (rural locality), a khutor in Starocherkasskoye Rural Settlement of Aksaysky District in Rostov Oblast; 
Rybatskoye (rural locality), a selo in Anivsky District of Sakhalin Oblast
Rybatskaya, a village in Pechengsky Selsoviet of Kirillovsky District in Vologda Oblast